Sanusha Santhosh is an Indian actress who works predominantly in Malayalam cinema.

Early life
She is from Pallikunnu, Kannur District, Kerala, she has studied at Sreepuram School, pallikunnu Kannur. After her graduation in B.Com. from S. N. College, Kannur, she did Masters in Sociology at St. Teresa's College. Sanusha has a younger brother Sanoop Santhosh, who is a child artist, known for his acting in Philips and the Monkey Pen.

Career
After performing in Television serials, Sanusha started her film career in 2000 at the age of 5 with the movie Dada Sahib. She became a star in Malayalam films as baby Sanusha giving stellar performances in Meesa Madhavan, Kaazhcha, Mampazhakkalam etc. She won the Kerala State Film Award for Best Child Artist in 2004 for her performances in Kaazhcha and Soumyam. She debuted as a heroine in Tamil film Naalai Namadhe followed by demure roles in Renigunta, Nandhi and Eththan. In Malayalam she debuted as heroine opposite Dileep in Mr.Marumakan. In the Malayalam movie, Kuttiyum Kolum Sanusha acted against the midget actor Guinness Pakru, the role gave her rave reviews.  In Tamil film Alex Pandian she did an item song with Karthi.

Sanusha won a Special Jury Mention at the 2013 Kerala State Film Awards for Zachariayude Garbhinikal.

Filmography

Television career

Awards and nominations
Kerala State Film Awards
 2004 – Best Female Child Artist: Kaazhcha,Soumyam
 2014 – Special Mention: Zachariayude Garbhinikal for her portrayal of Zaira,a pregnant girl.
61st Filmfare Awards South
Nominated -Filmfare Awards South for Best Supporting Actress for Zachariayude Garbhinikal for her portrayal of Zaira,a pregnant girl.
3rd South Indian International Movie Awards
3rd South Indian International Movie Awards for Best Actress in a Supporting Role – Zachariayude Garbhinikal
Kerala State Television Awards
 2006 – Best child Artist-Violin
Asianet Television awards
 2007-Best child Actress – Unniyarcha
 2008-Best Child Actress – Amma Manassu
Asianet Film Awards 
 2004 - Best Child Artist Female – Kaazhcha''

References

External links

 

People from Kasaragod district
Indian film actresses
Indian child actresses
Actresses from Kerala
Actresses in Tamil cinema
Living people
Actresses in Malayalam cinema
Child actresses in Malayalam cinema
Indian television actresses
21st-century Indian actresses
Actresses in Malayalam television
Actresses in Telugu cinema
Actresses in Kannada cinema
St. Teresa's College alumni
1994 births